Maguna is a town in the Mehsana district of Gujarat in Western India.

History 
Maguna was a Seventh Class taluka and princely state, also comprising four more villages, part of the Katosan thana, in Mahi Kantha Agency and ruled by Makwana Koli chieftains.

It had a combined population of 3,235 in 1901, yielding a state revenue of 11,959 Rupees (1903-4, nearly all from land) and paying a tribute of 892 Rupees, to the Gaekwar Baroda State.

Sources and external links 
 Imperial Gazetteer, on dsal.uchicago.edu - Mahi Kantha

References

Cities and towns in Mehsana district
Princely states of Gujarat

External links 
 A Collection of Treaties, Engagements, and Sanads Relating to India and Neighbouring Countries, Volume 6